This is a list of number-one singles in Australia from the Kent Music Report era to its current ARIA Charts.

 1940s || 1950s || 1960s || 1970s || 1980s || 1990s

2000s
 2000 || 2001 || 2002 || 2003 || 2004 || 2005 || 2006 || 2007 || 2008 || 2009

2010s
 2010 || 2011 || 2012 || 2013 || 2014 || 2015 || 2016 || 2017 || 2018 || 2019

2020s
 2020 || 2021 || 2022 || 2023

See also

List of number-one albums in Australia

References
 Charts sourced from David Kent's Australian Chart Book: based on the Kent Music Report
Australian Record Industry Association (ARIA) official site